The Lola T270 is an open-wheel racing car chassis, designed, developed and built by Lola Cars, that competed in the CART open-wheel racing series, for competition in the 1972 and 1973 USAC Championship Car seasons. It didn't win any races, with its best race result being a 2nd-place finish; being driven by Wally Dallenbach at Michigan in 1972. Its best Indianapolis 500 result was a 4th-place finish; being driven by Sam Sessions, in the 1972 race. It was powered by three different engines; including Ford and Foyt-badged Ford V8 turbo engines, or an Offenhauser four-cylinder turbo engine.

References 

Open wheel racing cars
American Championship racing cars
Lola racing cars